Standish Hall was an estate and country house, built in 1573, owned by the Standish family in the south-west of Standish, Wigan. No standing structures of the hall remain on the former estate, however, some of its wooden-panel interiors are preserved elsewhere.

History

The original building was a wattle and daub H-shaped building constructed in 1574. In 1684 a wing built of brick was added to the north, and during the same period, many alterations were made to the original house. In 1748 another three-story brick wing was added to the west. Around 1780 the moat, which till then surrounded the hall, was filled up with earth. A final extension further west was added in 1822.

By the late-19th-century it stood in extensive parkland with forests, grasslands and large fishponds. The hall and its Roman Catholic chapel were at the centre of the estate, which had a series of interconnecting path systems and possibly a ha-ha to the south. A track to the north led to the  Hermitage.

The last member of the Standish family to live in the hall was Charles Strickland Standish. He left the hall and later let it to Thomas Darwell, the Mayor of Wigan, in 1824 or 1825. The estate was then leased to several tenants by the Standish Family over the years, including Nathaniel Eckersley who died there in 1892.

The last lord of the Standish manor, Henry Noailles Widdington Standish, died in 1920 leaving no children or heirs. He was brought up in France and never lived in the Hall. The estate was broken up and put up for auction in 1921 by its then-owner James Birkett Almond, however, the hall itself failed to reach its reserve price of £4,800 and so was withdrawn. In 1923 the Chappel and Tudor Hall were demolished, and the remainder was left in ruin. The last standing part of the hall, which had been split up into two smaller houses during the 20th century, was demolished around 1982, when the National Coal Board acquired the land.

Preservation of interiors

While no standing sections of the hall remain, four of its room's wood-panelled interiors are known to survive today, three of which were transported to the U.S. and one remains in England. The Jacobean drawing room and Elizabethan study (originally from Borwick Hall) were bought by William Randolph Hearst and shipped to New York in the 1930s. The study later was donated to the Detroit Institute of Arts where it remains in storage, as of 2020. The drawing-room was later bought by Tony Hulman and installed in his Lingen Lodge, which is now used by the Rose–Hulman Institute of Technology. The library was bought by Ralph H. Booth in 1922, and used in his mansion in Grosse Pointe, Detroit. The dining room was bought in 1924, and incorporated into Halsway Manor in Somerset.

The locations of the preserved interiors were rediscovered in 2020, through research undertaken by local historians.

Catholicism

Catholic mass was said at Standish Hall from 1559, during the English Reformation, and some of the chaplains which served the Standish Family included Laurence Vaux and Edward Bamber. In 1694, the Hall was suspected to be a centre for Jacobitism, and many of the local Catholic gentry were put on trial for their beliefs. During the Jacobite rising of 1715, Ralph Standish joined the Scots Army and fought at the Battle of Preston. Due to his actions against the crown, he was sentenced to death, though he was later reprieved. In 1742 a new chapel was built on the estate, and for nearly half of the 19th century it was served by Benedictines.

The nearby Cat 'i'th' Window Cottage is associated the Hall, local tradition says the placement of black plaster cats in its windows indicated when there was a Catholic mass being held there or if there were government troops in the area.

References

External links

 The House of Standish -The french connection, on Myles Standish.info website

Buildings and structures in the Metropolitan Borough of Wigan
Standish, Greater Manchester
Country houses in Greater Manchester